Melaleuca calycina is a shrub in the myrtle family, Myrtaceae, and is endemic to the south-west of Western Australia. It is a stiff, erect shrub with oval to heart-shaped leaves, white flowers and star-shaped fruit.

Description 

The flowers are white or cream-coloured and occur singly or in small groups, sometimes at the ends of branches and sometimes in the leaf axils. At the base of each flower there are brown, papery, overlapping bracts. The stamens are arranged in 5 bundles around the flower, each bundle containing 22 to 25 stamens. Flowering occurs from July to October but mostly in September.

Taxonomy and naming
Melaleuca calycina was first formally described in 1812 by Robert Brown  in Hortus Kewensis. The specific epithet (calycina) is from the Greek kalyx, calyx, (collectively the sepals).

Distribution and habitat
This melaleuca occurs from the Stirling Range to Cape Arid in the Coolgardie, Esperance Plains and Mallee biogeographic regions. It grows in a wide range of soils on flats, laterite and the edges of swamps.

Conservation status
Melaleuca calycina is listed as "not threatened" by the Government of Western Australia Department of Parks and Wildlife.

References

calycina
Myrtales of Australia
Rosids of Western Australia
Plants described in 1812
Endemic flora of Western Australia